KZAP (96.7 MHz) is a commercial FM radio station licensed to Paradise, California, with studios and offices in and broadcasting to the Chico, California, area. KZAP airs a classic rock format.

History
The station signed on the air on June 4, 1977, as KNVR-FM, then in 1992 changed to KZZP. In 1995, The "Z" switched to "A" and the current call letters KZAP became reality. KZAP became the market's AC leader in 2000 as "Star 96.7" and in 2002 switched to Rhythmic Top 40 as "Club 96.7". Program director wa Randy Zachary, also former owner and main on-air personality at KYIX-FM.

On June 18, 2007, KZAP flipped to adult album alternative and adopted the KPIG brand for the Chico area. The format was not successful in the market, and on May 10, 2010, the station switched to its news/talk format. The station then decided to change to an oldies format in March 2011 called "Classic Hits 96.7". After KFMF dropped its classic rock format in August 2019 (following a sale of the stations to Bustos Media, who promptly sold them to Deer Creek Broadcasting), KZAP shifted to a more classic rock-heavy lean, serving as a replacement for KFMF. In addition, Longtime Chico personality Marty Griffin joined the station as program director and Steve Michaels joined as afternoon host.  http://www.kzap967.com

Former logo

Current logo
https://kzap967.com/assets/files/kzap-id-round-rgb-250x250.png

See also
 KRXQ for the station that used the KZAP call sign 1968-1992

References

External links
Former club967.com website at archive.org

ZAP (FM)
Classic rock radio stations in the United States
Radio stations established in 1977